Hunter is a two-part BBC One police crime drama, commissioned in 2008 as a follow up to Five Days, the 2007 series which introduced the protagonists of Hunter – DSI Iain Barclay (Hugh Bonneville) and DS Amy Foster (Janet McTeer) – who reprise their roles as the dysfunctional detective pair. The two-part drama aired on Sunday 18 and Monday 19 January 2009 on BBC One, and achieved an average of 5.4 million viewers during first episode. The drama was also simulcast on BBC HD. The drama was intended as a backdoor pilot for a potential series, but no further episodes were commissioned. On 15 October 2009, the drama was released on Region 4 DVD in Australia via Roadshow Entertainment.

Plot
DSI Iain Barclay heads up a team of police officers that are looking into the disappearance of two boys. He calls in the assistance of former colleague DS Amy Foster to help with the investigation. The perpetrators turn out to be radical members of the anti-abortion movement, who threaten to kill the two children unless the BBC screens an anti-abortion propaganda film. Barclay, Foster and their colleagues must race against time to apprehend the kidnappers before they can carry out their threats.

Cast
DSI Iain Barclay — Hugh Bonneville
DI Zoe Larson — Eleanor Matsuura
DS Amy Foster — Janet McTeer
DS Nick Dyer — Geoffrey Streatfeild
DC Sue Mailer — Anna Koval
DC Connor — Nathan Constance
DC Miles — Jonathan Slinger
DS Jim MacAulay — Tim Woodward
ACC Jenny Griffin — Harriet Walter
Dr. Margaret Newell — Clare Holman
John Elder — Adrian Rawlins
Peter Richards — Joe Tucker
Phillippa Richards — Sarah Ball
Jan Speddings — Sophie Stanton
Hannah Crowley — Frances Albery

References

External links
 
 

BBC television dramas
2009 British television series debuts
2009 British television series endings
2000s British television miniseries
2000s British crime drama television series